Pokémon, known in Japan as , is a Japanese anime television series produced by animation studio OLM for TV Tokyo. It is adapted from the Pokémon video game series published by Nintendo. The series follows the young ten-year-old Pokémon trainer Ash Ketchum and his adventures with his electric mouse partner Pikachu (voiced by Ikue Ōtani), and a varying group of friends in his quest to become a Pokémon Master.

The division between seasons of Pokémon is based on the Japanese version openings of each episode and reflect the actual production season. The English episode numbers are based on their first airing either in syndication, on Kids' WB, Cartoon Network, Disney XD or on Netflix. Subsequent episodes of the English version follow the original Japanese order, except where banned episodes are shown.

Episode list

Season 1: Indigo League (1997–1999)

Season 2: Adventures on the Orange Islands (1999)

Season 3: The Johto Journeys (1999–2000)

Season 4: Johto League Champions (2000–01)

Season 5: Master Quest (2001–02)

Season 6: Advanced (2002–03)

Season 7: Advanced Challenge (2003–04)

Season 8: Advanced Battle (2004–05)

Season 9: Battle Frontier (2005–06)

Season 10: Diamond and Pearl (2006–07)

Season 11: Diamond and Pearl: Battle Dimension (2007–08)

Season 12: Diamond and Pearl: Galactic Battles (2008–09)

Season 13: Diamond and Pearl: Sinnoh League Victors (2010)

Notes

External links
 
 
 

Pokémon Seasons 1-13
episodes Seasons 1-13
Pokémon episodes